Gemco Rail is a Western Australian company specialising in the remanufacturing and repair of railway locomotives, wagons, track maintenance equipment, bearings and other railway components.

Formed in 1987 it is based in Forrestfield, Perth. In July 2007 Gemco Rail was purchased by Coote Industrial.

Gemco Rail has manufactured items of track maintenance equipment and intermodal container wagons. It has also overhauled locomotives for fellow Engenco subsidiary Greentrains. and rebuilt some former State Rail Authority RUB carriages as crew carriages for SCT Logistics.

References

Forrestfield, Western Australia
Railway maintenance companies of Australia
Rolling stock manufacturers of Australia
Manufacturing companies established in 1987
Australian companies established in 1987